The All-Ireland Cup, also known as the Bateman Cup, is a knock-out competition for the winners of the four provincial rugby union cups in Ireland.

History
The Bateman Cup ran from 1922 to 1939 as a competition for the four provincial cup-winners, but did not continue after the Second World War. The competition was revived in 1975 for the centenary of the Irish Rugby Football Union. In 2006, an All-Ireland Cup was instituted for the top teams in the All-Ireland League, and in 2010 this was changed to the old Bateman Cup format, with only the four provincial cup winners taking part, and the Bateman Cup trophy presented to the winners. The Bateman Cup was originally presented to the IRFU by Dr Godfrey Bateman, a member of a well-known West Cork family, in memory of his sons Reginald and Arthur who were killed during the First World War, who played for Sir Patrick Dun's Hospital in the Dublin Hospitals Rugby Cup.

Past finals

1922–39 (Bateman Cup)
Source: IRFU (3 May 2014)

 1921–22 Lansdowne 6–5 Cork Constitution
 1922–23 Bective Rangers 6–5 Instonians
 1923–24 Queen's University 29–11 UCD
 1924–25 Bective Rangers 6–3 Garryowen
 1925–26 Dublin University 6–3 Garryowen
 1926–27 Instonians 16–8 Lansdowne
 1927–28 Young Munster 6–3 Lansdowne
 1928–29 Lansdowne 19–12 Galwegians
 1929–30 Lansdowne 19–12 North of Ireland
 1930–31 Lansdowne 16–5 Collegians
 1931–32 Queen's University 19–0 Cork Constitution
 1932–33 not played
 1933–34 not played
 1934–35 North of Ireland 14–0 Bective Rangers
 1935–36 UCC 17–0 UCG
 1936–37 Queen's University 8–0 UCC
 1937–38 UCD 16–6 Young Munster 
 1938–39 Blackrock College 4–3 North of Ireland

Centenary tournament
 1974–75 St Mary's College 9–9 Galway Corinthians (St Mary's won on try count)

2006–10 (AIB Cup)
 2005–06 Cork Constitution 37–12 St Mary's College
 2006–07 Garryowen 20–7 Belfast Harlequins
 2007–08 Shannon 12–9 Blackrock College
 2008–09 Ballynahinch 17–6 Cork Constitution
 2009–10 Cork Constitution 15–11 Garryowen

2010s (Bateman Cup)
 2010–11 Bruff 24–18 Dungannon
 2011–12 Garryowen 24–6 Ballymena
 2012–13 Cork Constitution 24–19 St Mary's College
 2013–14 Cork Constitution 19–6 UCD
 2014–15 Cork Constitution 24–9 Clontarf
 2015–16 Cork Constitution 38–19 Galwegians
 2016–17 Cork Constitution 18–13 Old Belvedere
 2017–18 Lansdowne 32–12 Cork Constitution
 2018–19 Garryowen 45–21 City of Armagh

2020s
 2019–20 unfinished 
 2020–21 not played
 2021–22 Lansdowne 46–13 Young Munster
 2022-23

Performance by club

See also
Connacht Senior Cup (Rugby Union)
Leinster Senior Cup (rugby union)
Munster Senior Cup (rugby union)
Ulster Senior Cup (rugby union)

References

Irish senior rugby competitions
1921 establishments in Ireland